The Complete Stories of J. G. Ballard is a short story collection by J. G. Ballard, published in 2009 by W. W. Norton & Company.

It contains all short stories appeared in the anthology The Complete Short Stories of J. G. Ballard: Volume 1 & Volume 2 (2006), adding 3 stories: The Ultimate City, The Secret Autobiography of J.G.B. and The Dying Fall.

References

External links

Dystopian literature
2009 short story collections
Short story collections by J. G. Ballard
W. W. Norton & Company books